The Fleming Fjord Formation, alternatively called the Fleming Fjord Group is an Upper Triassic geological formation in the northeastern coast of Jameson Land, Greenland. It consists of terrestrial sediments and is known for its fossil content.

Description 
It is of Norian to Rhaetian age and is subdivided into three members; at the base the Edderfugledal Member, followed by the Malmros Klint Member with the Ørsted Dal Member at the top. It was deposited in a large shallow to ephemeral lake.

Paleobiota 
The fauna of Fleming Fjord is diverse, including sauropodomorph dinosaurs, pterosaurs, temnospondyls, mammaliaforms, aetosaurs, and other taxa. Freshwater unionid bivalves and conchostracans have been reported from the Malmros Klint Member.

Fish 
Lungfish, actinopterygian, and chondrichthyan teeth have been reported from the Malmros Klint Member.

Amphibians

Reptiles 
Besides the forms described below, a diverse ichnofauna of small and large tracks has also been reported from the Malmros Klint Member, as well as coprolites and additional theropod, pterosaur, and turtle fossils.

Synapsids

See also 
 List of dinosaur-bearing rock formations
 List of fossiliferous stratigraphic units in Greenland

References

Bibliography 
 

Geologic formations of Greenland
Triassic System of Europe
Triassic System of North America
Triassic Greenland
Norian Stage
Rhaetian Stage
Sandstone formations
Shale formations
Lacustrine deposits
Ichnofossiliferous formations
Paleontology in Greenland